Jinzhou Province was one of the provinces of Manchukuo. It was established 1934, when the old Fengtian Province was split into the Andong Province, Fengtian Province and Jinzhou Province. Jinzhou was mostly Chinese with Korean minorities within it too. The Province mostly acted as a place for Japanese use of its resources and its use for invading China due to its closeness to the country.

Creation 
Jinzhou was created on December 1, 1934 and was mostly based on Jinzhou city. Mostly created as an easy way to govern the city. During the creation, many minorities were abused.

Dissolvement 
The sign of it being dissolved is the Soviets starting to invade Manchuria, almost a week later in August 1945, Japan and Manchukuo would surrender and then Jinzhou would be dissolved.

Administrative divisions 

 Jinzhou City
 Fuxin City 
 Jinxian
 Jinxi County
 Xingcheng County
 Suizhong County
 Yixian
 Beizhen County
 Panshan County
 Tai'an County
 Heishan County
 Zhangwu County
 Tumote Right Banner
 Tumut Zhongqi
 Tumote Zuoqi

Governors 

 Sir Xu Shou : December 1, 1934 – July 1, 1937
 Wang Zidong : July 1, 1937 – July 28, 1938
 Jiang Enzhi : July 28, 1938 – October 11, 1941
 Wang Duanrui : October 11, 1941 – (End of the war)

See also
 List of administrative divisions of Manchukuo

Provinces of Manchukuo